Michael James German, Baron German, OBE (born 8 May 1945) is a British politician, serving currently as a member of the House of Lords and formerly as a member of the National Assembly for Wales for the South Wales East region. He was leader of the Welsh Liberal Democrats from 2007 to 2008. In 1996, he was awarded an OBE for his public and political service.

Biography
German was educated at the Open University and St Mary's College.  In his early life he was a member of 28th Cardiff Sea Scout Group.

He trained and worked as a music teacher before becoming Head of the European Unit at the Welsh Joint Education Committee.  Has also been a school governor.

Political career
His political career spans over three decades. He was elected as councillor on Cardiff City Council (Cathays ward) in 1983, together with his wife, Georgette German (Plasnewydd). He was Leader of the Welsh Liberal Democrats on the City Council between 1983–1996 and joint leader of the Council from 1987 to 1991; he was elected to the National Assembly for Wales in 1999 and re-elected in 2003 and 2007.

In the 1996 New Year Honours he was appointed an Officer of the Order of the British Empire "for political and public service".

He contested Cardiff North in October 1974 and 1979 for the Liberals, before fighting Cardiff Central in 1983 and 1987 for the SDP–Liberal Alliance, but was unsuccessful on each occasion. In the first Welsh Assembly election in 1999, he contested the Caerphilly constituency, coming third with 12.4% of the vote. He was however elected at the same election for the South Wales East regional seat.

Under a Labour-Liberal Democrat coalition he became Deputy First Minister 2000-01 (and Economic Development Secretary) and again in 2002-03 (and Minister for Rural Affairs and Wales Abroad).  He stepped down from the role of Deputy First Minister between the two dates to answer allegations made about his role at the Welsh examination board, the WJEC.  During this period he was temporarily replaced by Jenny Randerson as Acting Deputy First Minister.

In November 2007, Mike German became leader of the Welsh Liberal Democrats, after Lembit Opik stood down to ensure that the leadership of the party was in the National Assembly and not Westminster. He was succeeded in 2008 by Kirsty Williams.

German's political interests include skills development in small and large companies in Wales, constitutional affairs, local government, economy and regeneration.

In May 2010, German was named to the House of Lords as a 'working peer' in the 2010 Dissolution Honours list. He was succeeded to the Assembly in June 2010 by his wife, Veronica, a Torfaen councillor, as she was the next candidate on the regional party list in 2007. German took his seat as Baron German, of Llanfrechfa in the County Borough of Torfaen.

In the House of Lords
In summer 2021, it was proposed by the Second Johnson ministry to mandate that care home staff be required as a condition of employment to maintain COVID-19 vaccination status, as part of the Health and Social Care Act 2008 (Regulated Activities) (Amendment) (Coronavirus) Regulations 2021. The members of the Secondary Legislation Scrutiny Committee, amongst whom was German, raised concerns about this proposal. German said at the time that "we have consistently made clear our view that all key definitions and criteria on which decisions that might affect a person’s welfare or livelihood will be made, should be included in legislation and not in guidance which cannot be subjected to appropriate Parliamentary scrutiny or approval."

References

External links
 Michael German AM website
 Michael German AM official biography at the National Assembly for Wales website
 Welsh Liberal Democrats website
 Official biography at House of Lords

Offices held

1945 births
Living people
Liberal Democrat members of the Senedd
Wales AMs 1999–2003
Wales AMs 2003–2007
Wales AMs 2007–2011
Leaders of political parties in Wales
Officers of the Order of the British Empire
Councillors in Cardiff
Alumni of the Open University
Members of the Welsh Assembly Government
Liberal Democrats (UK) life peers
Life peers created by Elizabeth II